Coiste na nIarchimí (Ex-Prisoner's Committee) is an organisation founded in 1998 to facilitate the reintegration of Irish Republican released prisoners of The Troubles.

References

External links

Political advocacy groups in Northern Ireland
Organizations established in 1998
1998 in Northern Ireland
Prisoner support
Prison-related organizations
Philanthropic organisations based in Northern Ireland